is a Japanese musician and YouTuber from Osaka Prefecture who is signed to Sony Music Associated Records. Starting her career as an independent musician in 2011, Nanawo gained a following performing at various live houses in Japan, as well as through uploading songs on the website Niconico. She was also cast in a stage play adaptation of the mobile game Fate/Grand Order. She made her major debut in 2018, performing the opening theme to the anime television series Happy Sugar Life. She released her first full album in October of that year.

Biography
Nanawo was born in Osaka Prefecture on November 12, 1995. She had been interested in music for much of her life, and in junior high school, she primarily listened to anison and Vocaloid music. In particular, she had become a major fan of the dōjin music producer DECO*27. She was inspired to become a singer after listening to the music of Bump of Chicken and discovering YouTube.

Nanawo made her debut as a singer in 2011, performing in an indie band which held live shows throughout Japan. After the band broke up, she pursued a solo career. In 2014, Nanawo beat over 5000 others who had participated in an audition held by Sony Music Artists In 2016, she began uploading dōjin music on the Japanese video-sharing website Niconico. She also became a co-host of a radio program titled Rock Brothers. She quickly gained a following on Niconico: as of March 2018, her videos had been viewed at least 9 million times. She also began collaborating with other dōjin  artists for her songs, including DECO*27. In 2017, she was cast as the character Mash Kyrielight in a stage play adaptation of the mobile game Fate/Grand Order. She released a mini-album titled  in July of that year.

During a live performance in Tokyo in March 2018, Nanawo announced that she would make her major debut under Sony Music later that year. Her first single,  was released on August 22, 2018; the song "One Room Sugar Life" is used as the opening theme to the anime television series Happy Sugar Life. The single peaked at #33 on Oricon's weekly charts and charted for nine weeks. She released her first major album  on October 3, 2018. Her second major single  was released on February 5, 2020; the title song is used as the ending theme to the anime television series Science Fell in Love, So I Tried to Prove It. Her third major single "Higher's High" was released on October 21, 2020; the title song is used as the opening theme to the anime television series Warlords of Sigrdrifa.

In 2022, she had her first overseas performance in Anime Festival Asia Singapore 2022.

Discography

Independent releases

Major releases

Singles

Albums

References

External links
Official website 

Youtube channel

1995 births
Anime musicians
Living people
Musicians from Osaka Prefecture
Sony Music Entertainment Japan artists
Japanese YouTubers
Utaite